Dr. Kewal Krishan, an Indian forensic anthropologist, is a Professor of physical anthropology and former Chair of Department of Anthropology  at Panjab University, Chandigarh, India.  He has   contributed to the  development of forensic anthropology in India. He is one of the very few forensic anthropology experts of the nation.

Early life and education
Krishan was born in 1973 in a small village Mullanpur Garibdass of District Mohali in Punjab state of north India. He studied at Munnalal Puri Government Senior Secondary School till 1987. He completed his Bachelor's degree, Master's degree in Anthropology and earned Ph.D. in Forensic Anthropology in 2003 from Panjab University, Chandigarh, India. He is an elected fellow of the Royal Anthropological Institute of Great Britain and Ireland (FRAI).

Ranking in Career
Dr. Krishan has been recently ranked amongst the top 2% scientists of the world in the field of Legal & Forensic Medicine based on a study conducted by Stanford University scientists.  He is the only anthropologist from India listed in the prestigious world’s top 2% scientists. He is positioned at 17th rank in Legal & Forensic Medicine category worldwide.  He is one of the most cited forensic scientists having 301 publications with more than 44,000 citations. 

Dr Krishan recently secured 3rd rank in the forensic anthropology research worldwide according to a bibliometrics study published by Journal of Forensic and Legal Medicine.

Research and Innovation
His published research deals with the analysis of various aspects of human morphology and their forensic applications in Indian populations. He has contributed articles to the Encyclopedia of Forensic Sciences 2nd Edition and Encyclopedia of Forensic and Legal Medicine 2nd Edition published by Elsevier in 2013  and 2016  respectively.
His  most cited work pertains to the forensic podiatry of the north Indian population. In one of his noteworthy work in 2008, he studied the effect of body weight and additional body weight on the footprints and its interpretation in crime scene investigation.
He also established some of the unique and individualistic characteristics of the footprints which are helpful in identification of criminals. He devised and calculated the effect of limb asymmetry on estimation of stature in forensic examinations. He devised a novel index called Heel-Ball Index in the forensic literature emphasizing its relevance in sex determination. He has published unique work on the footprint ridge density of Indian population and its significance in forensic identification.

References

1973 births
Living people
Fellows of the Royal Anthropological Institute of Great Britain and Ireland
Forensic anthropologists
Indian forensic scientists
Indian anthropologists
Scientists from Chandigarh
People from Chandigarh district
Panjab University alumni
Indian medical writers
Physical anthropologists
Academic staff of Panjab University